Walter Christian Ploeser (January 7, 1907 – November 17, 1993) was a U.S. Representative from Missouri and United States Ambassador to Paraguay and Costa Rica.

Born in St. Louis, Missouri, Ploeser attended the public schools of St. Louis, Missouri, Casper and Lusk, Wyoming, and the City College of Law and Finance, St. Louis, Missouri.
He engaged in the insurance business in St. Louis, Missouri, in 1922 and founded his own company in 1933.
Organizer and chairman of the board of Marine Underwriters Corp. 1935.
He served in the State house of representatives in 1931 and 1932.

Ploeser was elected as a Republican to the Seventy-seventh and to the three succeeding Congresses (January 3, 1941 – January 3, 1949).
He served as chairman of the Select Committee on Small Business (Eightieth Congress).
He was an unsuccessful candidate for reelection in 1948 to the Eighty-first Congress.
He served as delegate, 1964 and 1968 Republican National Conventions.
He resumed the insurance business.
He served as director of Webster Groves Trust Company.
Ambassador to Paraguay in 1957–1959.
He served as chairman of board, The Salvation Army from 1967 to 1969.
Ambassador to Costa Rica in 1970–1972.
He was a resident of St. Louis, Missouri, until his death on November 17, 1993.

References
 
 

1907 births
1993 deaths
Ambassadors of the United States to Paraguay
Ambassadors of the United States to Costa Rica
Republican Party members of the United States House of Representatives from Missouri
20th-century American politicians